John Henry MacMahon (1829–1900) was a Church of Ireland cleric, known as a scholar of patristics and the scholastic philosophers.

Life
Born at Dublin in 1829, he was the son of John Macmahon, a barrister. He was educated at Enniskillen, and on 1 July 1846 entered Trinity College, Dublin, as a pensioner; he graduated B.A. in 1852, being senior moderator and gold medallist in ethics and logic, and proceeded M.A. in 1856.

MacMahon took holy orders in 1853, and was for some years a curate under William Alexander, later Archbishop of Armagh. He left parochial work after the disestablishment of the Church of Ireland church in 1869. He was subsequently chaplain to the lord-lieutenant, and from 1890 to Mountjoy Prison. He died in Dublin on 23 May 1900. His daughter was the romance novelist Eleanor MacMahon.

Works
MacMahon was deeply read in Aristotle, the Christian fathers, and the schoolmen, but was not considered an original thinker. His works were:

Metaphysics of Aristotle, literally translated from the Greek (1857), in Bohn's Classical Library
A Treatise on Metaphysics, chiefly in reference to Revealed Religion (1860)
Church and State in England: its  Origin and Use (1873), arguing for the maintenance of the established church
The Refutation of all Heresies by Hippolytus, translated (1888) in the Ante-Nicene Library

Notes

Attribution

External links
 

1829 births
1900 deaths
19th-century Irish Anglican priests
Irish writers
Irish translators
19th-century translators